Kathryn Sellers (December 25, 1870 – February 23, 1939) was the woman to be appointed a federal judge in the United States. She was nominated to the head of the Juvenile Court of the District of Columbia by President Woodrow Wilson in 1918.

Biography
Sellers was born on December 25, 1870, in Broadway, Ohio. She worked as a bibliographer and librarian, and was employed by the weather bureau in Washington, D.C., and by the U.S. Department of State from 1900 to 1911. During this time Sellers became a member of the Women's Bar Association of the District of Columbia. 

In 1918, Wilson nominated her to be head of the Juvenile Court of the District of Columbia. She was confirmed later that year, making her the first woman appointed to the federal bench. Sellers served as a judge until she resigned on February 17, 1934. 

She died on February 23, 1939, at her home in Washington, D.C., and is buried in Oakdale Cemetery in Marysville, Ohio.

See also
List of first women lawyers and judges in the United States

References

External links
 

1870 births
1939 deaths
People from Union County, Ohio
American women judges